The Journal of Arid Environments is a monthly peer-reviewed scientific journal published by Elsevier. It covers research on the physical, biological, and cultural aspects of arid, semi-arid, and desert environments. According to the Journal Citation Reports, the journal has a 2012 impact factor of 1.772.

References

External links 
 

Elsevier academic journals
Monthly journals
English-language journals
Ecology journals
Publications with year of establishment missing